Headquartered in Los Angeles, Bank of Hope has been providing financial services to the largest Korean American community in the country for more than 40 years and is today one of the leading Asian American banks in the United States.

Bank of Hope serves a multi-ethnic population of customers through 54 full-service branches across nine states and 13 Loan Production Offices adding presence in three additional states. With $18.9 billion in assets, the strength of the Bank lies in an experienced management team, focus on sound risk management and governance practices, and commitment to the communities that they serve.

Building on expertise in small business lending, C&I lending, and international trade finance, Bank of Hope is today a diversified financial institution capable of meeting more of a customer's banking needs. The expanded offering of commercial and consumer products and services now includes residential mortgage and warehouse lending, credit cards, equipment lease financing and foreign currency, among others.

Formed through two mergers of equals, Bank of Hope includes many of the first banks established by Korean immigrants in the United States, and the roots of the company go back more than 40 years.

The first merger of equals forming BBCN Bank was completed on November 30, 2011, between Center Bank, established in 1986, and Nara Bank, established in 1989. Prior to the first merger of equals, Nara Bank had acquired Asiana Bank in April 2003 and Center Bank had acquired Innovative Bank in April 2010, which acquisitions expanded their presence into the Northern California market. After the formation of BBCN, the acquisitions of Pacific International Bank in February 2013 and Foster Bank in August 2013 solidified BBCN’s presence in the greater Seattle and Chicago markets, respectively.

The second merger of equals forming Bank of Hope was completed on July 29, 2016, between BBCN Bank and Wilshire Bank.  Wilshire Bank was established in 1980, December 30th and grew independently in Southern California until the acquisition of Liberty Bank of New York in August 2005. The acquisition of Mirae Bank was completed in June 2009 strengthening its presence in Southern California. The BankAsiana acquisition in October 2013 nearly doubled the Bank’s presence in the New York/New Jersey markets and the Saehan Bank transaction in November 2013 further solidified its presence in Southern California, prior to the second merger of equals. Today, Bank of Hope has a national platform that includes solid presence in all of the top geographic markets in the U.S. with the largest Asian American populations. But most importantly, Bank of Hope is well established as the representative bank and the pride of the Korean American community.

History
Bank of Hope goes back more than 40 years from now. The bank was first established on December 30, 1980, under the name, Wilshire Bank. 

On November 30, 2011, Nara Bank, which was established in 1989, merged with Center Financial Corporation, which was established in 1986. Nara Bancorp, Inc. changed its name to BBCN Bancorp, Inc. Center Bank changed its name to BBCN Bank. BBCN was an acronym for Business Bank of Center and Nara.

On February 15, 2013, the company acquired Pacific International Bancorp, the holding company for Pacific International Bank, a Washington state-chartered bank with 4 branches in the Seattle metropolitan area.

In August 2013, the company acquired Foster Bankshares, Inc. and became the largest Korean-American Bank in Chicago.

In July 2016, BBCN Bank and Wilshire Bank merged and were rebranded as Bank of Hope, with Hope Bancorp, Inc., as the bank holding company.

In 2017, the bank almost acquired U & I Financial Corp, based in Seattle, but the acquisition was called off at the last minute.

In August 2017, the bank opened a branch in Houston.

In late 2020, the Wall Street Journal reported that the bank faced over $3 billion of loans with payment deferrals or modifications due to the COVID-19 pandemic, which represented 170% of the bank's tier-1 capital. Over 50% of the bank's assets were in the form of commercial real-estate loans, the second-highest ratio of all banks in its size class.

References

External links
 

Companies listed on the Nasdaq
Banks established in 2000
Banks based in California
Companies based in Los Angeles
Korean-American culture in Los Angeles
Korean American banks